Amphinema byssoides is a species of corticioid fungus known to form mycorrhizal relationships with spruce trees.

It was first described as Thelephora byssoides in 1801 by Christiaan Hendrik Persoon,
but was transferred to the genus Amphinema by John Eriksson in 1958.

References 

Atheliales
Fungi described in 1801
Taxa named by Christiaan Hendrik Persoon